Robert T. "Bob" McElwee (born August 20, 1935) is a former American football official, who served for 42 years, with 27 of those years in the National Football League (NFL) from 1976 to 2003.  In the NFL, he wore the uniform number 95 for most of his career.

Education

McElwee graduated from Haddonfield Memorial High School, where he was a three sport letterman, and a 1957 graduate of the United States Naval Academy, where he played linebacker for the football team and was a member of the Sugar Bowl championship team in 1955.  Following graduation, McElwee was commissioned in the United States Air Force serving as a pilot and utilities engineer.

McElwee began officiating in 1961 while stationed at Hamilton Air Force Base in California. Upon discharge from the military, he returned home to the Philadelphia area and began officiating high school football. In 1966, McElwee received his first college assignment from the Eastern College Athletic Conference.  He also spent 10 years officiating in the Ivy League.

Career

McElwee joined the NFL in 1976 as a line judge and became a referee for the start of the  1980 NFL season.  He was the referee for three Super Bowls (XXII in 1988, XXVIII in 1994, and XXXIV in 2000) and has officiated in numerous playoff games. McElwee is one of only 6 referees who have officiated 3 or more Super Bowls, along with Norm Schachter, Jim Tunney, Pat Haggerty, Jerry Markbreit and Terry McAulay. He is also the only referee to officiate a Super Bowl in 3 different decades.  He was also the alternate referee in Super Bowl XVII in 1983.  His final game was the 2003 Pro Bowl.

Bob is a partner in the McElwee Group, a firm specializing in construction of water filtration and waste water treatment plants and is heavily involved in community service.  He is co-founder of Renew, an inner-city non-profit organization dedicated to providing housing for the disadvantaged in Camden, New Jersey.  He has also worked on fund-raising efforts for the American Red Cross. He was also a long time member of the N.J. Chapter, Associated Builders & Contractors (ABC).

McElwee currently resides in Haddonfield, New Jersey, and is married with two sons, Scott and Tommy, and one daughter, Suzanne. He has six grandchildren: Sydney, Connor, Davis, Carter, Emma and Aline.

Television career
McElwee served as head referee for the television show, American Gladiators, in 1989-1990.
Referee for ESPN's Battle of the Gridiron Stars.

Awards
Art McNally Award, 2002
NASO Gold Whistle Award, 2004
March of Dimes Citizen of the Year Award, 1993
Outstanding Citizenship Award from the New Jersey State Interscholastic Athletic Association

References

1935 births
Living people
American football linebackers
College football officials
Haddonfield Memorial High School alumni
National Football League officials
Navy Midshipmen football players
People from Haddonfield, New Jersey
Sportspeople from Camden, New Jersey
Players of American football from Camden, New Jersey
Military personnel from New Jersey